The Amiable Child Monument is a monument located in New York City's Riverside Park.  It stands west of the southbound lanes of Riverside Drive north of 122nd Street in Morningside Heights, Manhattan.

It is a monument to a small boy who died in what was then an area of country homes near New York City.  One side of the monument reads: “Erected to the Memory of an Amiable Child, St. Claire Pollock, Died 15 July 1797 in the Fifth Year of His Age.”  The monument is composed of a granite urn on a granite pedestal inside a wrought iron fence.  It is across the street from Grant's Tomb. The monument, originally erected by George Pollock, who was either the boy's father or his uncle, has been replaced twice due to deterioration.  The present marker was placed on the site in 1967 to replace a marble marker installed by the city in 1897.

During Morningside Heights’s Golden Age, when the nearby Claremont Inn served luminaries that included George M. Cohan, Cole Porter, Lillian Russell and Mayor Jimmy Walker, the site inspired pilgrimages and poetry.  Of the many verses written about the memorial is Herman George Scheffauer’s “An Amiable Child,” which describes the grave as being “like a song of peace in iron frays.”  An identically named poem by Anna Markham, wife of proletarian author and critic Edwin Markham, opens with the lines that defined the monument for her contemporaries:  “At Riverside, on the slow hill-slant / Two memoried graves are seen / A granite dome is over Grant / and over a child the green.”  The monument is also the inspiration for Irene Marcuse's novel Death of an Amiable Child.

By one late nineteenth-century account, as related by Donald Reynolds, an attempt to relocate the grave in order to clear space for General Grant’s tomb, which was quickly abandoned by the city after a groundswell of public opposition, transformed the “tribute to the gentleness that underlies the apparent brutality of the great city” into “almost a national institution”.

The monument is thought to be the only single-person private grave on city-owned land in New York City.

Notes

External links
Daytonian in Manhattan blog

1967 sculptures
Granite sculptures in New York City
Monuments and memorials in Manhattan
Morningside Heights, Manhattan
Outdoor sculptures in Manhattan
Riverside Park (Manhattan)
Washington Heights, Manhattan